The 2016–17 Iowa Hawkeyes men's basketball team represented the University of Iowa in the 2016–17 NCAA Division I men's basketball season. The team was led by seventh-year head coach Fran McCaffery and played their home games at Carver–Hawkeye Arena as members of the Big Ten Conference. They finished the season 19–15, 10–8 in Big Ten play to finish in a four-way tie for fifth place. They lost in the second round of the Big Ten tournament to Indiana. They were one of the last four teams not selected for the NCAA tournament and thus received a No. 1 seed in the National Invitation Tournament where they defeated South Dakota in the first round before losing to TCU in the second round.

Previous season
The Hawkeyes finished 2015–16 season with a record of 22–11, 12–6 record in Big Ten play to finish in a four-way tie for third place in conference. In the Big Ten tournament, they were upset by Illinois in the second round. They received an at-large bid to the NCAA tournament where they defeated Temple in the First Round before losing to eventual National Champion, Villanova, in the Second Round.

Departures

2016 recruiting class

2017 Recruiting Class

2018 Recruiting Class

Roster

Schedule and results

|-
!colspan=9 style=| Exhibition

|-
!colspan=9 style=| Non-conference regular season

|-
!colspan=9 style=|Big Ten regular season

|-
!colspan=9 style=| Big Ten tournament

|-
!colspan=9 style=| NIT

Source: Schedule

References

Iowa
Iowa Hawkeyes men's basketball seasons
Iowa
Hawk
Hawk